Grant is an unincorporated community in Mason County, in the U.S. state of Washington.

History
A post office called Grant was established in 1901, and remained in operation until 1920. Mary Grant, an early postmaster, gave the community her name.

References

Unincorporated communities in Mason County, Washington
Unincorporated communities in Washington (state)